Armand J. Swartenbroeks (30 June 1892 – 3 October 1980) was a Belgian football (soccer) player who competed in the 1920 Summer Olympics. He was a member of the Belgium team, which won the gold medal in the football tournament.

Honours

Club

Daring Club de Bruxelles 
 Belgian First Division: 1911–12, 1913–14, 1920–21

International

Belgium 

 Olympic Gold Medal: 1920

Individual 

 Former Belgium's Most Capped Player: 1928–1938 (50 caps)

References

External links
profile
 

1892 births
1980 deaths
Belgian footballers
Footballers at the 1920 Summer Olympics
Footballers at the 1924 Summer Olympics
Olympic footballers of Belgium
Olympic gold medalists for Belgium
Belgium international footballers
Olympic medalists in football
Medalists at the 1920 Summer Olympics
Association football defenders

pt:Oscar Verbeeck